In enzymology, an acyl-[acyl-carrier-protein]-phospholipid O-acyltransferase is an enzyme that catalyzes the chemical reaction

acyl-[acyl-carrier protein] + O-(2-acyl-sn-glycero-3-phospho)ethanolamine  [acyl-carrier protein] + O-(1,2-diacyl-sn-glycero-3-phospho)ethanolamine

Thus, the two substrates of this enzyme are acyl-acyl-carrier protein and O-(2-acyl-sn-glycero-3-phospho)ethanolamine, whereas its two products are acyl-carrier protein and O-(1,2-diacyl-sn-glycero-3-phospho)ethanolamine.

This enzyme belongs to the family of transferases, specifically those acyltransferases transferring groups other than aminoacyl groups.  The systematic name of this enzyme class is acyl-[acyl-carrier protein]:O-(2-acyl-sn-glycero-3-phospho)ethanolamine O-acyltransferase. Other names in common use include acyl-[acyl-carrier, protein]:O-(2-acyl-sn-glycero-3-phospho)-ethanolamine, and O-acyltransferase.  This enzyme participates in glycerophospholipid metabolism.

References

 

EC 2.3.1
Enzymes of unknown structure